Hope-Full is an album by  jazz pianist Elmo Hope recorded in 1961 for the Riverside label. Hope performs 5 solo piano pieces and three piano duets with his wife Bertha.

Reception

The AllMusic review by Scott Yanow stated "solo albums by the bop musicians were considered a bit unusual, but Elmo Hope (an underrated composer and pianist) fares quite well during this Riverside set".

Track listing
All compositions by Elmo Hope except as indicated
 "Underneath" - 4:35     
 "Yesterdays" (Otto Harbach, Jerome Kern) - 5:18     
 "When Johnny Comes Marching Home" (Traditional) - 4:58     
 "Most Beautiful" - 5:03     
 "Blues Left and Right" - 6:05     
 "Liza (All the Clouds'll Roll Away)" (George Gershwin, Ira Gershwin, Gus Kahn) - 3:32     
 "My Heart Stood Still" (Lorenz Hart, Richard Rodgers) - 5:23     
 "Moonbeams" - 4:50

Personnel 
Elmo Hope - piano 
Bertha Hope - piano (tracks 2, 5 & 7)

References 

1962 albums
Riverside Records albums
Elmo Hope albums
Solo piano jazz albums